The 1904 college football season had no clear-cut champion, with the Official NCAA Division I Football Records Book listing Michigan, Minnesota, and Penn as having been selected national champions.

1904 was a big year for the South. It was the first year for: Dan McGugin at Vanderbilt, Mike Donahue at Auburn, and John Heisman at Georgia Tech.

Conference and program changes

Membership changes

Conference standings

Major conference standings

Independents

Minor conferences

Minor conference standings

Awards and honors

All-Americans

The consensus All-America team included:

Statistical leaders
Team scoring most points: Minnesota, 725 to 12.
Rushing leader: Willie Heston, Michigan, 686
Rushing avg. leader: Willie Heston, 12.7
Rushing touchdowns leader: Willie Heston, 21

References